Simon Aban Deng is a Sudanese human rights activist living in the United States. He is a victim of child slavery. A native of the Shilluk Kingdom in southern Sudan, Deng spent several years as a domestic slave in southern Sudan.

Biography

A Sudanese refugee, he was enslaved at the age of nine when his neighbor asked Deng to accompany him on a trip.  Deng was given as a "gift" to the neighbor's family.  Having escaped slavery and emigrated to the United States, he now travels the country addressing audiences which range from the United Nations to middle school students.  His speeches focus on education and the anti-slavery movement. Deng works as a lifeguard at Coney Island.

Deng says in his account of his capture and subsequent abduction: "... I was a slave. ... When I was nine years old, my village was raided by Arab troops in the pay of Khartoum. As we ran into the bush to escape I watched as childhood friends were shot dead and the old and the weak who were unable to run were burned alive in their huts. I was abducted and given to an Arab family as a "gift"."

During his time as a slave, Deng was put through inhumane acts. He remembers being punished for not responding loudly enough, beaten by groups of other children, and having nothing but "patience... and my faith" as friends. He was forced to say yes to everything, including torture, and remembers times when "the only thing I could do was ask for mercy... and mercy was not always there."

Sudan Freedom Walk
The Sudan Freedom Walk can refer to one of several such events organized by Simon Deng used to raise awareness of human rights issues in Sudan.

Walks
Sudan Freedom Walk, April 2006, New York City, New York to Washington, D.C., United States of America
Second Sudan Freedom Walk, December 2006, Brussels, Belgium to The Hague, Netherlands
Sudan Freedom Walk Chicago, May 2007, Chicago, Illinois, United States of America

References

External links

Interview with Simon Deng – transcript
Interview with Simon Deng – video, part 1
Interview with Simon Deng – video, part 2
Interview with Simon Deng – video, part 3

Year of birth missing (living people)
Living people
Refugees
Slavery in Sudan
South Sudanese emigrants to the United States
Sudanese human rights activists
Sudanese slaves
Lifeguards